The Presbyterian Guardian was a monthly conservative Presbyterian magazine. Founded by conservative theologian John Gresham Machen in 1935, it acted as the de facto publication of the Orthodox Presbyterian Church, whose members made up most of its readership, despite being officially unaffiliated with any one denomination. In 1979, it merged with The Presbyterian Journal, which had a significantly larger circulation and similar conservative theological stances.

History 
On 7 October 1935, Rev. John Gresham Machen established The Presbyterian Guardian to serve as the voice of conservative Presbyterianism in the United States, the main denomination of which, the Presbyterian Church in the United States of America, had become fairly liberal and modernist. James T. Dennison, Jr., compiler of a cumulative index to the magazine, wrote that The Presbyterian Guardian was "conceived in controversy." Machen had been encountering significant theological disagreements with Dr. Samuel G. Craig, editor of Christianity Today (1930–1949) (not to be confused with Christianity Today, the magazine founded in 1956). In response to perceived modernism in the magazine, Machen began publishing The Guardian with a small group of conservative ministers and laymen, hiring Rev. H. McAllister Griffiths as the first Editor.

The magazine saw eight more editors during its tenure, including Machen himself, as well as Revs. Ned Stonehouse, Charles Woodbridge, and Paul Woolley. Machen's name was proudly displayed on the masthead of the magazine from January 1938 until 1979, reading: "J. Gresham Machen, Editor 1936-37."

In April 1978, the Board of Trustees asked J. Cameron Fraser, a native Scot who was then a graduate student at Westminster Seminary to take the position of Managing Editor for 14 months while they contemplated the newspaper's future. On 30 August 1979, the Board voted to merge The Presbyterian Guardian with The Presbyterian Journal. Fraser's term as Managing Editor was extended into autumn and the final issue was published in October 1979. The Presbyterian Journal ceased publication in 1987, and in the same year the magazine World was created by Joel Belz. World, unlike its predecessor, is not explicitly Presbyterian, but of the same conservative Protestant slant.

List of editors

Board of Trustees 
The following made up the last Board of Trustees of The Presbyterian Guardian:
 Rev. O. Palmer Robertson, Acting President
 Rev. LeRoy B. Oliver, Secretary
 Rev. George E. Haney, Treasurer
 F. Kingsley Elder, Jr. 
 Leonard Lowrey 
 James R. Peaster
 Rev. John H. White
 Hugh Brown
 Rev. John P. Galbraith 
 Rev. Robley J. Johnston 
 Rev. Arthur W. Kuschke, Jr.
 Rev. Paul Settle
 John Van Voorhis
 Glenn H. Andreas
 Rev. Edmund P. Clowney
 Rev. Joseph A. Pipa, Jr.
 Rev. Robert L. Reymond
 Rev. A. Michael Schneider III

See also 
 John Gresham Machen
 Orthodox Presbyterian Church
 World (magazine)

References

External links
 The Presbyterian Guardian archives

1935 establishments in Pennsylvania
1979 disestablishments in Pennsylvania
Monthly magazines published in the United States
Religious magazines published in the United States
Christian magazines
Defunct magazines published in the United States
Magazines disestablished in 1979
Magazines established in 1935
Magazines published in Philadelphia